Rachel Marguerite "Cutie" Borromeo del Mar (born November 3, 1966) is a  Filipina politician. She served as the representative for the 1st district of Cebu City from 2010 to 2013.

Early life and education 
A native of Cebu City, del Mar spent her elementary years at the Cebu International School, and went to high school at Saint Theresa's College of Cebu. She began collegiate studies at the University of the Philippines Cebu, majoring in hotel and restaurant management, and eventually earned her B.A. in mass communications, cum laude, at the University of San Jose-Recoletos. She is currently working towards a master's degree in public management at the Ateneo de Manila University.

Early career 
In 2007, then president Gloria Macapagal Arroyo appointed del Mar to the board of directors of the Cultural Center of the Philippines. That same year, she was also named as one of the board members of the Movie and Television Review and Classification Board (MTRCB). Her tenure with both institutions lasted until November 2009.

Del Mar started co-hosting the talk show "She Said, She Said" in August 2008 with Jackie Aquino-Gavino, a TV personality and a first cousin of then president Benigno Aquino III. Aside from this, she has also performed with the theater group Repertory Philippines, has done both runway and commercial modeling, and has played bit parts in both local and foreign films shot in the Philippines.

Her most recent position prior to taking her congressional seat was as chief of staff to her father, former Congressman and Deputy Speaker of the House of Representatives Raul del Mar. She held this post from July 2008 to November 2009 to which she then resigned to begin her electoral campaign.

Political career 
As his father wrapped up his third and last term as congressman, the younger del Mar was selected to run in his place. In the 2010 elections, her closest rival was then Lahug barangay captain Mary Ann de los Santos. She defeated de los Santos by close to 40,000 votes.

Del Mar previously served as the vice chairperson of the Committee on Inter-Parliamentary Relations and Diplomacy, as well of the Committee on Public Information. She was also a member of the committees on Appropriations, Games and Amusements, Legislative Franchises, and Tourism.

During the 15th Congress, del Mar sponsored several bills such as House Bill 00023, "An Act Providing for a Magna Carta of the Poor", House Bill 00372, "An Act Requiring the Mandatory Pre-Audit of Government Disbursements and Uses of Funds", HB00559, "An Act to Include Entrepreneurial and Financial Literacy Education for Secondary School Students", among many others. She has also co-authored or co-sponsored to well over 200 bills. She was also noted for her perfect record of attendance while Congress was in session.

Committee assignments 
Committee on Inter-Parliamentary Relations and Diplomacy
Committee on Public Information
Committee on Appropriations
Committee on Games and Amusements
Committee on Legislative Franchises
Committee on Tourism

Other leadership positions 
 Assistant Secretary, Cebu Chamber of Commerce & Industry

Electoral history

References 

1966 births
Living people
Filipino television personalities
People from Cebu City
Liberal Party (Philippines) politicians
Members of the House of Representatives of the Philippines from Cebu City
University of San Jose–Recoletos alumni
University of the Philippines Cebu alumni